Marjorie Cook Education Center is a school based in San Diego, California.  It is affiliated with the Institute for Effective Education.

Programs 
 Elementary Program
 Adolescent Program
 Community Living Program
 Young Person's Annex

References 
 Institute for Effective Education website

Schools in San Diego